Ajak Ateng Magot Anok (born 3 March 1992) is a South Sudanese professional basketball player for H.R. Portviejo of the Liga Ecuatoriana de Baloncesto in Ecuador.

He played for the South Sudanese national basketball team at the FIBA AfroBasket 2017 qualifiers.

References

External links
ESPN Profile
Scout Basketball Profile
Eurobasket.com profile

1992 births
Living people
South Sudanese expatriates in Ecuador
South Sudanese men's basketball players
Idaho State Bengals men's basketball players
Centers (basketball)